Gad Barzilai (born 1958) is a full professor of law, political science and international studies, famous for his work on the politics of law, comparative law and politics, human rights and communities. Barzilai published heretofore 18 books and 173 articles in major academic refereed journals and publishing houses. He has been a full professor of law, societies and justice, and international studies at University of Washington, and the University of Haifa Faculty of Law. Gad Barzilai has served as the Dean of the Faculty of Law at University of Haifa (2012-2017) and was the Vice Provost of University of Haifa from 2016 until 2019.

He was a professor of political science and law at Tel Aviv University where he served (1996-2004) as its co-founder and co-director of the Law, Society and Politics Graduate Program.

Biography 
Barzilai was born on January 11, 1958, in Tel Aviv to parents who had survived the Holocaust. He studied History, Judaism and Political Science at Bar-Ilan University, Law at Tel Aviv University, and in 1987 he received his PhD from the Hebrew University in Jerusalem which awarded him several prestigious prizes including Fulbright. After completing his PhD and LLB [JD] he studied quantitative research methods at University of Michigan, Ann Arbor, and completed a post doctorate at Yale University. Later he continued to teach at Yale University before deciding to return to Israel.

He served as a professor at Tel Aviv University in the political science department and the law school. Barzilai was the first founding director (1999–2002) of the newly established international Dan David Prize, which is among the three large prize foundations in the world, bestowing international prizes and scholarships for academic and scientific international excellence. In 2004 he moved to University of Washington where he has been a professor in the Law, Societies, and Justice Program, Comparative Law and Society Studies Center, and in the Jackson School of International Studies. In 2012 he was elected and serves as the Dean of the Faculty of Law at University of Haifa.    
 
Barzilai was the co-founder and co-chair of the Israeli Association of Law and Society. He is a board member of the Law and Society Association (Class of 2006), American Journal of Political Science (1998–2003), Association of Israel Studies (1993–1996, 2007– ), Israel Studies Forum (2004–  ), and the Journal of Comparative Studies (2006– ). He is active in international, Israeli and Israeli-Palestinian human rights organizations and has advised senior politicians and NGOs on issues of law and politics. Barzilai was elected in 2011 as the President of the Association for Israel Studies and served as its President (2011-2013).

Gad Barzilai is best known for his critical analysis of law as a dimension in political power, which should be understood through using combined methodologies of socio-political-legal studies. His work emphasizes the importance of legal pluralism, political elite, critical communitarianism, cultural relativism and political power in local, state and global sites. Barzilai has published numerous books and articles on these issues.

References

External links 
 Professor Gad Barzilai's official home page
 Gad Barzilai website at University of Haifa
 The Minerva Center
 Gad Barzilai's personal home page at University of Washington
 Gad Barzilai's on twitter
 Gad Barzilai on RSS feed
 Prof. Gad Barzilai was named in the WorldWideLearn.com list of the Top 50 Law Professors on Twitter
Selected Books
 Gad Barzilai, 1996, Wars, Internal Conflicts and Political Order: A Jewish Democracy in the Middle East, Albany: State University of New York Press
 Gad Barzilai and David Nachmias, 1998, Governmental Lawyering in the Political Sphere: Advocating the Leviathan, Israel Studies 3 (2): 30-46
 Gad Barzilai, 2003, Communities and Law: Politics and Cultures of Legal Identities, Ann Arbor: University of Michigan Press
 Gad Barzilai, 2007 Law and Religion, Aldershot: Ashgate Publishing LtD.
 Gad Barzilai, 2008 Beyond Relativism: Where is Political Power in Legal Pluralism, Theoretical Inquiries in Law 9 (2)
 Gad Barzilai, 2010 The Attorney General and the State Prosecutor: Is Institutional Separation Warranted?, Jerusalem: The Israel Democracy Institute
Selected Articles 
 Law is Politics
 The Case of Azmi Bishara: Political Immunity and Freedom in Israel
 Fantasies of Liberalism and Liberal Jurisprudence: State Law, Politics, and the Israeli-Arab-Palestinian Community
 Courts as Hegemonic Institutions: The Israeli Supreme Court in a Comparative Perspective 
 War, Democracy, and Internal Conflict: Israel in a Comparative Perspective
 Israel and Future Borders: A Multidimensional Approach to the Assessment of a Dynamic Process     
 Social Protest and the Absence of Legalistic Discourse: In the Quest for New Language of Protest
 The Ambivalence of Litigation: A Criticism of Power
 Cultured Technology: Internet and Religious Fundamentalism
 Culture of Patriarchy in Law: Violence from Antiquity to Modernity
 The Redemptive Principle of Particularistic Obligations: A Legal Political Inquiry
 National Security in Courts and Law: A Theoretical and Comparative Analysis

Critical theorists
Israeli political scientists
Israeli political philosophers
Social philosophers
Living people
Israeli lawyers
1958 births
Academic staff of the University of Haifa
University of Washington faculty
University of Michigan fellows
Bar-Ilan University alumni
Tel Aviv University alumni